Kwai Fong Estate is a public housing estate in Kwai Fong, Kwai Chung, New Territories, Hong Kong. It was built in the reclaimed land of Gin Drinkers Bay, later the town centre of Kwai Chung, south of Kwai Hing Estate. Kwai Fong station is named after the name of the estate. It comprises twelve buildings with a total of 6,400 units and a shopping arcade.

Background
Before redevelopment, it consisted of 11 buildings which were completed between 1971 and 1973. In 1982, the buildings were revealed to have structural defects. In 1985, the HKHA announced that the strength of the concrete in blocks 8, 9, 10 and 11 of Kwai Fong Estate was below standard. Those blocks were demolished between 1985 and 1989. Other old buildings were also demolished in the 1990s to cope with the estate redevelopment. The estate was later redeveloped with 12 new buildings built between 1987 and 2002.

Houses

Demographics
According to the 2016 by-census, Kwai Fong Estate had a population of 18,023. The median age was 46.8 and the majority of residents (94.2 per cent) were of Chinese ethnicity. The average household size was 2.9 people. The median monthly household income of all households (i.e. including both economically active and inactive households) was HK$22,540.

Politics
Kwai Fong Estate is located in Kwai Fong constituency of the Kwai Tsing District Council. It was formerly represented by Leung Yiu-chung, who was elected in the 2019 elections until February 2021.

See also

Public housing estates in Kwai Chung

References

Residential buildings completed in 1987
Residential buildings completed in 1990
Residential buildings completed in 1991
Residential buildings completed in 1993
Residential buildings completed in 1996
Residential buildings completed in 1998
Residential buildings completed in 2000
Residential buildings completed in 2002
Public housing estates in Hong Kong
1987 establishments in Hong Kong